Hypostomus vaillanti is a species of catfish in the family Loricariidae. It is native to South America, where it occurs in the Preto River basin in the São Francisco River drainage. The species reaches 18.5 cm (7.3 inches) SL and is believed to be a facultative air-breather.

References 

vaillanti
Fish of the São Francisco River basin
Fish described in 1877
Taxa named by Franz Steindachner